B13 may refer to:
 130 mm/50 B13 Pattern 1936, Soviet naval gun
 B13 (New York City bus) serving Brooklyn
 B13 road (Cyprus)
 B13tech, a futuristic fictional technology created by the character Brainiac 13 
 Bensen B-13, a Bensen aircraft
 Boston Thirteens, a Rugby League club competing in the USARL
 Chery B13, a 2007 Chinese Chery Automobile model
 District B13, a movie featuring David Belle
 HLA-B13, an HLA-B serotype
 Martin XB-13, a version of the Martin B-10 bomber
 Caro-Kann Defence, a common opening in the game of chess
 Moseley, a suburb of Birmingham, England, from its postcode
 Orotic acid, formerly known as Vitamin B
 Boron-13 (B-13 or 13B), an isotope of boron
 A chassis of the Nissan Sentra
 Queensland B13 class locomotive
 13 amp, type B – a standard circuit breaker current rating
 Jalan Uniten–Dengkil, in Selangor, Malaysia
 LNER Class B13, a class of British steam locomotives

See also
 13B (disambiguation)